Zatoka (or Bugaz) is an urban-type settlement in Bilhorod-Dnistrovskyi Raion, Odesa Oblast, in southwestern Ukraine. It belongs to Karolino-Buhaz rural hromada, one of the hromadas of Ukraine. The settlement is a local beach resort. Additionally, Zatoka contains a small port named Buhaz, which has a single pier and is part of the Port of Bilhorod-Dnistrovsky.

The settlement is located on a sand spit of the Dniester Estuary next to where the Dniester flows into the Black Sea.  It is 60 km from Odesa and 18 km from the city of Bilhorod-Dnistrovskyi in Odesa Oblast, in the historical region of Budjak or southern Bessarabia. 

In the Ukrainian language, "zatoka" refers to a bay.

Until 18 July 2020, Zatoka belonged to Bilhorod-Dnistrovskyi Municipality. The municipality was abolished as an administrative unit in July 2020 as part of the administrative reform of Ukraine, which reduced the number of raions of Odesa Oblast to seven. The area of Bilhorod-Dnistrovskyi Municipality was merged into Bilhorod-Dnistrovskyi Raion.

Zatoka Bridge opened in 1955 and carries the R70 national road and the railway line from Odesa to Bessarabia.

References

Urban-type settlements in Bilhorod-Dnistrovskyi Raion
Nude beaches
Spa towns in Ukraine
Karolino-Buhaz Hromada